The following is a list of Habsburg Serbs, that is, ethnic Serbs active in the Habsburg monarchy (1526–1804). The Serb community was commonly known as "Rascians".

Nobility and military personnel

 Crepović noble family (Pomoravlje)
 Crepović noble family (Herzegovina)
 Crepović noble family
 Radič Božić
 Stjepan Berislavić
 Ivaniš Berislavić
 Miloš Belmužević
 Jovan Branković
 Jovan Nenad
 Pavle Bakić
 Radoslav Čelnik
 Deli-Marko
 Starina Novak
 Jakšić noble family
 Vuk Grgurević
 Petar Ovčarević
 Mihailo Ovčarević
 Dimitrije Ovčarević
 Stefan Osmokruhović
 Petar Ljubojević
 Staniša Marković-Mlatišuma
 Bogić Vučković
 Đorđe Rac Slankamenac
 Josif Jovanović Šakabenta
 Josif Šišković
 Arsenije Loma
 Demeter Radossevich von Rados
 Maximilian Rakitievich von Topplitza
 Matthias Rebrovich
 Ignaz Stoianich
 Aron Stanisavljevich
 Axentius Milutinovich
 Theodor Milutinovich
 Peter Tersich von Cadesich
 Abraham Putnik
 Peter Duka von Kadar
 Paul Dimich von Popilla
 Joseph Lazarich
 Christoph Vojkovich von Voikiffy und Kloscok
 Janko Vojković von Klopoc und Trebinje
 Johann von Devchich
 Petar Ljubibratich von Trebinje
 Paul Sokolovich
 Josef Bogdan von Sturmbruck
 Ignaz Csivich
 Franz Csorich
 Martin Csollich
 Johann Maroevich
 Franz Maurich
 Emmerich Blagoevich
 Balthasar Simunovich
 Jacob Simonovich
 Lazar Mamula
 Daniel Rastich
 Paul Jankovich
 Anton Csorich
 George Unukić
 Gabriel Rodić
 Ludwig Stankowics
 Adam Bajalics von Bajahaza
 Simon Ivchich
 Peter von Orešković
 george Rossich
 Anton Pejacsevich
 Franz Burich von Pournay
 Andreas Karaczay
 Franjo Martinich
Petar Ovčarević (fl. 1521–41), commander
Mihailo Ovčarević (fl. 1550–79), commander
Dimitrije Ovčarević (fl. 1552–66), commander
Jovan Ovčarević (fl. 1557), deputy
Péter Petrovics (1486–1557), magnate
Nikola Crepović (fl. 1542–58), magnate
Ivan Rac (fl. 1551), nobleman
Jovan Temišvarac (fl. 1564)
Mihajlo Temišvarac (fl. 1571)
Sava Temišvarac (fl. 1594–1610)
Deli-Marko (fl. 1596)
Đorđe Rac Slankamenac (fl. 1596), ban of Craiova, member of the Branković
Petar Rac (fl. 1596)
Starina Novak (fl. 1596)
Jovan Rac-Toholjević-Smederevac
Adam Rac
Vučina, commander under Matei Basarab in Muntenia
Sava Temišvarac the Younger (fl. 1640s)
Stefan Osmokruhović (fl. 1665–d. 1666), rebel leader
Jovan Monasterlija (fl. 1683–1706), general, Serbian Militia
Antonije Znorić (fl. 1688–d. 1695), Austrian colonel, Serbian Militia
Pera Segedinac (1655–1736), captain
Staniša Marković-Mlatišuma (1664–1741), Serbian Militia commander
Vuk Isakovič (1696–1759), Serbian Militia commander
Đorđe Sečujac (fl. 1715–59), Austrian captain (active 1715–59)
Arsenije Šečujac
 Lazar Mamula
Jovan Albanez (fl. 1711–27), Russian colonel
Bogić Vučković (fl. 1735–45), a rebel leader in Austrian service
Petar Ljubojević (fl. 1754–55), rebel leader
Jovan Šević (d. c. 1764), Austrian and Russian general
Jeronim Ljubibratić (1716–1779), Austrian general
Vuča Žikić (fl. 1788–d. 1808), Austrian soldier and Serbian Revolutionary
Arsenije Sečujac (1720–1814), Austrian general (active 1741–83)
Paul Davidovich (1737-1814), Austrian Lieutenant general
Josef Philipp Vukassovich (1755-1809), Austrian Lieutenant general
Gavrilo Rodić (1812-1890), Austrian Lieutenant general
Paul von Radivojevich (1759-1829), Austrian Lieutenant general
 Georg von Duka, Austrian general
 Joseph von Dedovich, Austrian general
 Martin von Dedovich, Austrian general
 Johann von Devchich, Austrian general
Paul Dimich von Papilla, Austrian general
Peter Duka von Kadar, Austrian general
Abraham Putnik (1730-1795), Austrian general
Stanoje Glavaš (1763–1815), hajduk and Serbian Revolutionary
Karađorđe (1768–1817), leader of the First Serbian Uprising
 Theodor Milutinovich
 Axentius Milutinovich
 Peter Tesich
 Ignaz Stojanich
 Andreas Stoichevich
 Aron Stanisavljevich
 Matthias Rebrovich
 Maximilian Rakitievich
 Demeter Radossevich
 Ivan Marojevich
 Josif Šišković
 Joseph Cajten Knežić
 Ignaz Freiherr Csivich von Rohr
 Markus von Csollich
 Károly Knezić
 Joseph Lazarich
 Blasius Anton von Kovascevich
 Johann von Kovascevich

Clergy
Teodor of Vršac (fl. 1594–96), bishop of Vršac, leader of Banat Uprising
Arsenije III Čarnojević (1633–1706), exiled Serbian Patriarch
Vikentije Jovanović (1689–1737), Metropolitan of Karlovci (1732–37)
Pavle Nenadović (1703–1768), Metropolitan of Karlovci (1749–68)
Teodor Komogovinski (d. 1788), martyr
Mojsije Putnik (1728–1790), Metropolitan of Karlovci (1781–90)
Stefan Stratimirović (1757–1836), Metropolitan of Karlovci (1790–1836)

Politicians
Đorđe Branković (1645–1711), Transylvanian diplomat and writer
Dušan Popović (1877–1958), Serb member of Croatian parliament

Other
Teodor Kračun (1730–1781), painter
Dimitrije Bačević (1734–1770), icon painter and muralist
Nikola Nešković (1740–1789), painter
Teodor Ilić Češljar (1746–1793), painter
Pavel Đurković (1772–1830), painter
Georgije Bakalović (1786–1843), painter
Jovan Avakumović (1748–1810), poet
Petar Blagojevich (d. 1725), and Arnold Paole (d. c. 1726), alleged vampires
Gavril Stefanović Venclović (1670–1749), priest, writer, poet, orator, philosopher, and illuminator.
Zaharije Orfelin (1726–1785), polymath
Emanuilo Janković (1758–1792), writer, dramatist, philosopher, translator and editor
Jovan Rajić (1726–1801), writer, historian, traveller, and pedagogue, considered one of the greatest Serbian academics of the 18th century.
Teodor Filipović (1778–1807), writer, jurist and educator
Jovan Muškatirović (1743–1809), writer, lawyer and educator
Dositej Obradović (1739–1811), author, philosopher, linguist, traveler, polyglot and the first minister of education of Serbia
Avram Miletić (1755–fl. 1826), merchant and songwriter

Families
Branković
Ovčarević
Preradović

See also

List of Serbs

Bibliography
 
 
 
 
 
 
 
 
 

 
Habsburg
Serbs